Taylor & Francis Group is an international company originating in England that publishes books and academic journals. Its parts include Taylor & Francis, Routledge, F1000 Research and Dovepress. It is a division of Informa plc, a United Kingdom–based publisher and conference company.

Overview
The company was founded in 1852 when William Francis joined Richard Taylor in his publishing business. Taylor had founded his company in 1798. Their subjects covered agriculture, chemistry, education, engineering, geography, law, mathematics, medicine, and social sciences.

Francis's son, Richard Taunton Francis (1883–1930), was sole partner in the firm from 1917 to 1930.

In 1965, Taylor & Francis launched Wykeham Publications and began book publishing. T&F acquired Hemisphere Publishing in 1988, and the company was renamed Taylor & Francis Group to reflect the growing number of imprints. Taylor & Francis left the printing business in 1990, to concentrate on publishing. In 1998 it went public on the London Stock Exchange and in the same year bought its academic publishing rival Routledge for £90 million. Acquisition of other publishers has remained a core part of the group's business strategy. It merged with Informa in 2004 to create a new company called T&F Informa, since renamed back to Informa. Following the merger, T&F closed the historic Routledge office at New Fetter Lane in London, and moved to its current headquarters in Milton Park, Oxfordshire. Taylor & Francis Group is now the academic publishing arm of Informa, and accounted for 30.2% of group revenue and 38.1% of adjusted profit in 2017.

In 2018 Informa PLC reported Taylor & Francis publishes more than 2,700 journals, and about 7,000 new books each year, with a backlist of over 140,000 titles available in print and digital formats. It uses the Routledge imprint for its publishing in humanities, social sciences, behavioural sciences, law and education, and the CRC Press imprint for its publishing in science, technology, engineering, and mathematics. In 2017, T&F sold assets from its Garland Science imprint to W. W. Norton & Company and then ceased to use that brand.

Although generally considered the smallest of the 'Big Four' STEM (science, technology, engineering, and mathematics) publishers (Reed-Elsevier, Wiley-Blackwell, Springer, and Taylor & Francis), its Routledge imprint is claimed to be the largest global academic publisher within humanities and social sciences. The company's journals have been delivered through the Taylor & Francis Online website since June 2011. Prior to that they were provided through the Informaworld website. Taylor & Francis ebooks are now available via the TaylorFrancis website. Taylor & Francis operates a number of Web services for its digital content including Routledge Handbooks Online, the Routledge Performance Archive, Secret Intelligence Files and Routledge Encyclopedia of Modernism. Taylor & Francis offers Open Access publishing options in both its books and journals divisions and through its Cogent Open Access journals imprint.

Taylor & Francis is a member of several professional publishing bodies including the Open Access Scholarly Publishers Association, the International Association of Scientific, Technical, and Medical Publishers, the Association of Learned & Professional Society Publishers and The Publishers Association. In 2017, after collaborating for several years, T&F bought specialist digital resources company Colwiz. In January 2020, T&F bought open research publishing platform F1000.

The old Taylor and Francis logo depicts a hand pouring oil into a lit lamp, along with the Latin phrase alere flammam – "to feed the flame [of knowledge]". The modern logo is a stylised oil lamp in a circle.

Company figures
The group has about 1,800 employees in at least 18 offices worldwide. Its head office is in Milton Park, Abingdon in the United Kingdom, with other offices in Stockholm, Leiden, New York, Boca Raton, Philadelphia, Kentucky, Singapore, Kuala Lumpur, Hong Kong, Beijing, Shanghai, Taipei, Melbourne, Sydney, Cape Town, Tokyo and New Delhi.

Taylor & Francis reported a mean 2017 gender pay gap of 24.2% for its UK workforce, while the median was 8%. The fact that the average pay for women is significantly worse than the median pay (compared to men's) shows that women are underrepresented in the positions with the highest pay.

Controversies and evaluation

Journal protests
In 2013, the entire board of the Journal of Library Administration resigned in a dispute over author licensing agreements.

Academic practices
In 2016, Critical Reviews in Toxicology was accused by the Center for Public Integrity of being a "broker of junk science". Monsanto was found to have worked with an outside consulting firm to induce the journal to publish a biased review of the health effects of its product "Roundup".

In 2017, Taylor & Francis was strongly criticized for removing the editor-in-chief of International Journal of Occupational and Environmental Health, who accepted articles critical of corporate interests. The company replaced the editor with a corporate consultant without consulting the editorial board.

In 2017 as part of the Grievance studies affair hoax articles, the T&F journal Cogent Social Sciences accepted one of  "The conceptual penis as a social construct" that had previously been rejected by another Taylor & Francis journal, Norma: International Journal for Masculinity Studies, which suggested the study would be a good fit for Cogent Social Sciences. When the authors announced the hoax, the article was retracted. In 2018, another Grievance studies affair article "Human reactions to rape culture and queer performativity at urban dog parks in Portland, Oregon" was published in Gender, Place & Culture, which was also retracted later that year.

In December 2018, the journal Dynamical Systems accepted the paper Saturation of Generalized Partially Hyperbolic Attractors only to have it retracted after publication due to the Iranian nationality of the authors. The European Mathematical Society condemned the retraction and later announced that Taylor & Francis had agreed to reverse the decision. Previous instances of Taylor & Francis journals discriminating against Iranian authors were reported in 2013.

In 2022 there has been much debate about the Accelerated Publication service offered by Taylor & Francis for some of its biomedical journals. For $7,000, a scientist can expedite the peer review process and be published in as few as three weeks.

Manipulation of bibliometrics
Self-citation is a practise that can inflate the seeming prestige of a journal or group. In 2020, six T&F journals that exhibited unusual levels of self-citation, and as a consequence their journal impact factor suspended from Journal Citation Reports. An April 2022 article in the T&F journal Accountability in Research outlined some of the factors leading to consistent suspension from Journal Citation Reports.

Evaluation 
As of May 2022, 836 Taylor & Francis journals are listed in the Norwegian Scientific Index of which 753 have a rating of "level 1" (meets academic standard), 70 have a rating "level 2" (the highest level, indicating rigorous academic quality), one has a rating of "level X" (decision on rating in progress), and 13 have a rating of "level 0" (indicating non-academic quality).

Acquired companies and discontinued imprints

See also 
Taylor & Francis academic journals

References

Further reading

External links

Academic publishing companies
Book publishing companies of the United Kingdom
Companies based in Oxfordshire
British companies established in 1798
Publishing companies established in 1798
Vale of White Horse
1798 establishments in England